Sahan Kalan is a village in Tehsil Kharian, in the Gujrat District of Pakistani Punjab, 4 km southeast of Kotla Arab Ali Khan and 35 km north of Gujrat. It is situated at 32°49'30"N, 74°06'17"E. The name Sahan Kalan comes from Persian words meaning Big Strong man.

The main tribe in the village is the Thathaal Jat.

Villages in Gujrat District
Populated places in Gujrat District